A viral disease (or viral infection) occurs when an organism's body is invaded by pathogenic viruses, and infectious virus particles (virions) attach to and enter susceptible cells.

Structural Characteristics

Basic structural characteristics, such as genome type, virion shape and replication site, generally share the same features among virus species within the same family.
 Double-stranded DNA families: three are non-enveloped (Adenoviridae, Papillomaviridae and Polyomaviridae) and two are enveloped (Herpesviridae and Poxviridae). All of the non-enveloped families have icosahedral capsids.
 Partly double-stranded DNA viruses: Hepadnaviridae. These viruses are enveloped.
 One family of single-stranded DNA viruses infects humans: Parvoviridae. These viruses are non-enveloped.
 Positive single-stranded RNA families: three non-enveloped (Astroviridae, Caliciviridae and Picornaviridae) and four enveloped (Coronaviridae, Flaviviridae, Retroviridae and Togaviridae). All the non-enveloped families have icosahedral nucleocapsids.
 Negative single-stranded RNA families: Arenaviridae, Bunyaviridae, Filoviridae, Orthomyxoviridae, ParamyxoviridaeParamyxoviridae and Rhabdoviridae. All are enveloped with helical nucleocapsids.
 Double-stranded RNA genome: Reoviridae.
 The Hepatitis D virus has not yet been assigned to a family, but is clearly distinct from the other families infecting humans.
 Viruses known to infect humans that have not been associated with disease: the family Anelloviridae and the genus Dependovirus. Both of these taxa are non-enveloped single-stranded DNA viruses.

Pragmatic Rules
Human-infecting virus families offer rules that may assist physicians and medical microbiologists/virologists.

As a general rule, DNA viruses replicate within the cell nucleus while RNA viruses replicate within the cytoplasm. Exceptions are known to this rule: poxviruses replicate within the cytoplasm and orthomyxoviruses and hepatitis D virus (RNA viruses) replicate within the nucleus.
 Segmented genomes: Bunyaviridae, Orthomyxoviridae, Arenaviridae, and Reoviridae (acronym BOAR). All are RNA viruses.
 Viruses transmitted almost exclusively by arthropods: Bunyavirus, Flavivirus, and Togavirus. Some Reoviruses are transmitted from arthropod vectors. All are RNA viruses.
 One family of enveloped viruses causes gastroenteritis (Coronaviridae). All other viruses associated with gastroenteritis are non-enveloped.

Baltimore Group 
This group of analysts defined multiple categories of virus. Groups:
 I - dsDNA
 II - ssDNA
 III - dsRNA
 IV - positive-sense ssRNA
 V - negative-sense ssRNA
 VI - ssRNA-RT
 VII - dsDNA-RT

Clinical characteristics

The clinical characteristics of viruses may differ substantially among species within the same family:

See also
 List of latent human viral infections
 Pathogenic bacteria

References

External links 

Pathogenic microbes